The Eastern Goldfields Railway was built in the 1890s by the Western Australian Government Railways to connect Perth with the Eastern Goldfields at Coolgardie and Kalgoorlie.

History

The Eastern Railway opened in stages from Perth to Northam in the 1890s, and the Eastern Goldfields Railway extended this line through semi-desert to the Eastern Goldfields.

It opened in stages between 1894 and 1897.
Northam to Southern Cross:   (opened 1 July 1894)
Southern Cross to Boorabbin:   (opened 1 July 1896)
Boorabbin to Kalgoorlie:   (opened 1 January 1897)

The Goldfields Water Supply Scheme pipeline was later constructed along the railway line. The chief engineer for both the railway and the pipeline was C. Y. O'Connor.

In October 1917, the Commonwealth Railways' standard gauge Trans-Australian Railway from Port Augusta was completed through to Kalgoorlie, making it a break-of-gauge station.

Branches
At Kalgoorlie, lines branch off north to Malcolm and Leonora; and south to Esperance via the Esperance line. The Malcolm-Laverton branch was last used in 1957 and closed in 1960.

Gauge conversion
As part of the Federal Government's program to build a standard gauge line across Australia and the passing of the Railways (Standard Gauge) Construction Act 1961, work commenced on gauge converting the line to dual gauge with a new alignment further north of the existing line built between Southern Cross and Kalgoorlie. From Northam to Southern Cross, the railway was also realigned to reduce the number of road crossings, increase the minimum radius of curvature and lower the ruling gradient to 1:150.

The new alignment, as well as being generally straighter and more favourably graded, provided access to the iron ore deposits at Koolyanobbing, which were shipped by rail to Kwinana, near Perth, to supply Australian Iron and Steel's blast furnace.

The first official standard gauge iron ore train from Koolyanobbing arrived at Kwinana on 10 July 1967. On 3 August 1968, the Koolyanobbing-Kalgoorlie section opened for freight trains and on 4 November 1968, the first through freight train from Port Pirie arrived in Perth.

Upgrades
In November 2005, funding was announced to extend eight crossing loops to accommodate  trains at Bodallin, Darrine, Wallaroo, Lake Julia, Grass Valley, Bungulla, Booraan and Seabrook, and replace the final  of timber sleepers with concrete sleepers.

Services
Transwa's MerredinLink and Prospector services from Perth to Merredin and Kalgoorlie traverse the line as does Journey Beyond's Indian Pacific to Sydney. Other named trains to previously use the line were The Westland, The Kalgoorlie and the Trans-Australian.

Intrastate and interstate freight services are operated by Aurizon, Mineral Resources, Pacific National and SCT Logistics. CBH Group operate grain trains.

References

 
Railway lines in Western Australia
Railway lines opened in 1897
Standard gauge railways in Australia
Goldfields Water Supply Scheme
Recipients of Engineers Australia engineering heritage markers